Brahin or Bragin is a town in Belarus and the administrative center of Brahin District. It stands on the banks of the Brahinka River,  from the nearest railway (Chojniki station), and has a population of 3,700.

History
The settlement is first mentioned in the Hypatian Codex in 1147 as the important town of the Kyiv princedom. A significant part of Brahin's population traditionally was of Jewish descent. By the end of 19th century, 2,254 of 4,311 inhabitants were Jewish. During World War II, Brahin was under German occupation from 28 August 1941 to 23 November 1943. Many Jews in the area were killed by the German forces during that time:

On September 13, 1941, the Jews of Bragin were ordered to gather in a school for the purposes of selecting a monitor and his deputy, but when 300 Jews came at the indicated time the school they were surrounded by Germans and closed. After that, Jews were led out in groups to the edge of the village and shot.

As a result of the Chernobyl disaster, areas of the Brahin district were radioactively contaminated. 52 settlements were resettled, 9 of which are buried. From Brahin itself 1,651 families (4,892 people) were resettled.

Notable residents 

Siarhiej Palujan (1890 - 1910), Belarusian writer and publicist

Awards
In 2019, the city of Bragin received a passing pennant, a certificate and a cash award from the republican budget as the best settlement with a population of up to 10 thousand inhabitants in terms of sanitary condition and improvement.

References

External links

 Brahin at Belarus.by

Urban-type settlements in Belarus
Populated places in Gomel Region
Brahin District
Dregovichs
Kiev Voivodeship
Rechitsky Uyezd
Holocaust locations in Belarus